Brenda Crowe (31 July 1913 – November 2004) was a British gymnast. She competed in the women's artistic team all-around event at the 1936 Summer Olympics.

References

1913 births
2004 deaths
British female artistic gymnasts
Olympic gymnasts of Great Britain
Gymnasts at the 1936 Summer Olympics
Sportspeople from London